Kaytetye may refer to:
 Kaytetye people, an ethnic group of Australia
 Kaytetye language, their language